Sweet Owen is an unincorporated community located in Owen County, Kentucky, United States. Their post office  is closed.

References

Unincorporated communities in Owen County, Kentucky
Unincorporated communities in Kentucky